The Seaway 25 was designed by Doug Peterson of USA fame for Tom Stevenson in 1978 after Tom won the World half Ton championship in one of Doug's designs. The yacht was designed to sail well on the short sharp chop of Port Phillip Bay Melbourne Australia. Intended to rate as a quarter ton Trailer yacht under IOR and Junior Offshore Group racing both for Harbour and Inshore Yacht racing.

Specifications 

I = 25.5 ft (8.12 m)

J = 8.5 ft (2.7 m)

P = 27 ft (8.6 m)

E = 10 ft (3.18 m)

Sailing details 
Handicaps
 PHRF = ,
 Portsmouth = ,
 IRC  = ,
 IOR = 18.0 ft, (Quarter ton),

Class based Handicaps,
 CBH (Aust.) = 0.725, 
 Other = ,

Sailing Characteristics;
Well balanced helm in all conditions. Safe boat in rough seas and excelled in light ghosting conditions. Stern is narrower than more recent boats and has better than normal windward performance but will plane in moderate seas.

References 

 Magazine "Trailer Sailing" 1985, No 3, page 83, Publisher Michael Hannan

Sailing yachts
1970s sailboat type designs
Classes of World Sailing
Sailboat type designs by Doug Peterson